The Old Pike Inn is a historic inn and tavern located at New Albany, Floyd County, Indiana.  It was built about 1840, and is a two-story brick building with a hipped roof. The building was damaged in a tornado on March 23, 1917, and the building rebuilt. It remained a working tavern until 1997, when the owner decided to shut down and start working for Caesars Indiana.

It was listed on the National Register of Historic Places in 2001.

References

External links
State picture of Old Pike Inn

Buildings and structures in New Albany, Indiana
Hotel buildings on the National Register of Historic Places in Indiana
Buildings and structures completed in 1840
National Register of Historic Places in Floyd County, Indiana